Sandtorg Church ( or ) is a parish church of the Church of Norway in Harstad Municipality in Troms og Finnmark county, Norway. It is located in the village of Sørvika on the east side of the island of Hinnøya. It is one of the churches for the Sandtorg parish which is part of the Trondenes prosti (deanery) in the Diocese of Nord-Hålogaland. The red, wooden church was built in a long church design and a Swiss chalet style in 1933 using plans drawn up by the architect Sigurd Bjørhovde. The church seats about 250 people.

History

For many years, the people in the southern part of the municipality pushed for their own church. In 1918, the architect Sigurd Bjørhovde was hired to design a church by redesigning and enlarging an old meeting house that the municipality owned. The architect raised the roof of the old building and tried to use Swiss chalet style elements in the whole design. Due to hard economic times, the municipality did not have the funding until 1932. The church was completed in 1933 and it was consecrated on 13 July 1933 by the Bishop Eivind Berggrav.

See also
List of churches in Nord-Hålogaland

References

Harstad
Churches in Troms
Wooden churches in Norway
20th-century Church of Norway church buildings
Churches completed in 1933
1933 establishments in Norway
Long churches in Norway